Viktor Ivanovich Trofimov (22 March 1938 – 1 October 2013) is a former Soviet international speedway rider who reached the final of the Speedway World Championship in 1972 and 1975.
He also finished on the rostrum of the World Team Cup nine times between 1965 and 1976 but never won a gold medal. He achieved four silver (1966, 1971, 1972, 1975) and three bronze (1967, 1969, 1973) medals.
In the speedway team championship of the USSR he rode for 18 years for the team, "Raduga" (Rovno) and won two bronze medals.
First race - April 30, 1960;
retirement - October 15, 1995.
He was born in Leningrad, Russian SFSR.
In September 2011, a book was published about the sports career of Viktor Trofimov titled English "RADUGA" Viktor Trofimov.

World Final appearances

Individual World Championship
 1972 -  London, Wembley Stadium - 9th - 6pts
 1975 -  London, Wembley Stadium - 8th - 8pts

World Team Cup
 1965 -  Kempten (with Yuri Chekranov / Gennady Kurilenko / Vladimir Sokolov / Igor Plekhanov) - 4th - 7pts (0)
 1966 -  Wrocław, Olympic Stadium (with Boris Samorodov / Igor Plekhanov / Farid Szajnurov) - 2nd - 25pts (6)
 1967 -  Malmö, Malmö Stadion (with Igor Plekhanov / Boris Samorodov / Farid Szajnurov) - 3rd= - 19pts (4)
 1969 -  Rybnik, Rybnik Municipal Stadium (with Gennady Kurilenko / Vladimir Smirnov / Valeri Klementiev / Yury Dubinin) - 3rd - 23pts (0)
 1971 -  Wroclaw, Olympic Stadium (with Grigory Khlinovsky / Vladimir Gordeev / Vladimir Smirnov / Anatoly Kuzmin) - 2nd - 22pts - Reserve -
 1972 -  Olching, (with Anatoly Kuzmin / Grigory Khlinovsky / Viktor Kalmykov) - 2nd - 21 + 7 pts (5 + 1)
 1973 -  London, Wembley Stadium (with Aleksandr Pavlov / Vladimir Gordeev / Vladimir Paznikov / Grigory Khlinovsky) - 3rd - 20pts (2)
 1975 -  Norden, Motodrom Halbemond (with Vladimir Gordeev / Valery Gordeev / Grigory Khlinovsky) – 2nd – 29pts (8)
 1976 -  London, White City Stadium (with Valery Gordeev / Grigory Khlinovsky / Vladimir Gordeev) - 4th - 11pts (0)
* 1967 - No run-off was held for 3rd place. Bronze medals were awarded to both Great Britain and Soviet Union

References

1938 births
2013 deaths
Sportspeople from Saint Petersburg
Sportspeople from Rivne
Soviet speedway riders